Dubai Economic Council is a think tank and policy-making advisory body specialising on the economy of Dubai. It is affiliated with the Government of Dubai.

See also
 Derasat

References

External links
 

2003 establishments in the United Arab Emirates
Government agencies of Dubai
Political and economic think tanks based in the United Arab Emirates